Nelson Alom (born 27 October 1990) is an Indonesian professional footballer who plays as a defensive midfielder for Liga 1 club Persita Tangerang.

International career
In 2013, Alom represented the Indonesia U-23, in the 2013 Southeast Asian Games.

Honours

Club

Persipura Jayapura
 Indonesia Super League: 2013
 Indonesia Soccer Championship A: 2016

Persebaya Surabaya
 Indonesia President's Cup runner-up: 2019

International
Indonesia U-23
 Southeast Asian Games  Silver medal: 2013

References

External links
 Nelson Alom at Liga Indonesia

1990 births
Living people
People from Puncak Regency
Indonesian footballers
Association football midfielders
Liga 1 (Indonesia) players
Persipura Jayapura players
Persebaya Surabaya players
Madura United F.C. players
Persita Tangerang players
Indonesia youth international footballers
Southeast Asian Games silver medalists for Indonesia
Southeast Asian Games medalists in football
Competitors at the 2013 Southeast Asian Games
Sportspeople from Papua
Indonesian Super League-winning players
21st-century Indonesian people